The 2008 Eastern Michigan Eagles football team represented Eastern Michigan University during the 2008 NCAA Division I FBS football season. Eastern Michigan competed as a member of the Mid-American Conference. The team was led by head coach Jeff Genyk, who was released at the end of the season. He was replaced by Ron English.

2008 started with a bang in a 52-0 defeat of Indiana State. For longtime fans, this was repayment for an embarrassing loss to ISU in 2001. Despite the strong start, Eastern lost 4 straight after the opener, and was never close in any of them. Then they pulled off a road upset of Bowling Green, who had beaten BCS member Pittsburgh earlier in the year. But after that, they had two close losses by three at West Point to Army, and by seven at home to Akron.

After a loss to Temple on November 22, 2008, Eastern Michigan fired coach Jeff Genyk, but would allow him to coach the Eagle's final game of the season against rival Central Michigan. Many games lost by 7 points or less was one of the reasons given for firing Genyk. Eastern won that game, however, 56-52. Two national records were set against CMU as QB Andy Schmitt had 58 completions and Tyler Jones tied a record by catching 23 passes. With Eastern Michigan's win over Central Michigan, all three schools split the series, and Eastern retained the Michigan MAC Trophy on the tie. Schmitt finished 58/80 for 516 yards (school record), threw 5 TDs, and ran for one more. Most of these records were reset from just the week prior against Temple. In that game, Schmitt finished 50/76 for 485 yards, but Eastern was outscored by three. His 76 passes in a game without an interception set an NCAA record. He was only intercepted once against Central with 80 passes.

Schmitt's return as a 5th year senior in 2009 was a point of optimism for fans. For those two games he was 108/156 for 1001 yards and 1 interception. Perhaps the 2009 season would have been much different (instead of 0-12) if Schmitt had not gone down with a career-ending knee injury early in that season.

Schedule

Game summaries

Indiana State

Michigan State

Toledo

Maryland

Northern Illinois

Bowling Green

Army

Akron

Ball State

Western Michigan

Temple

Central Michigan

References

Eastern Michigan
Eastern Michigan Eagles football seasons
Eastern Michigan Eagles football